The city of Providence, Rhode Island is part of a media market that includes New Bedford, Massachusetts. The area is served by several local television stations, radio stations, newspapers, and blogs based in the cities proper and the surrounding communities of Rhode Island and Bristol County, Massachusetts.

Broadcast television

Providence is the center of Southern New England's broadcasting market, which also encompasses Bristol County, Massachusetts, which includes the cities of Fall River and New Bedford. The city is served by television stations representing every major American television network, as well as radio stations originating from Providence and Boston.

Radio
Providence is the center of Southern New England's broadcasting area, with many radio stations located in the city and surrounding communities, as well as some radio stations located in Bristol County, Central Massachusetts, and eastern Connecticut.

Newspapers
Several newspapers serve the Providence-New Bedford media market.

Television and movie productions
Providence and the surrounding area have been used as a backdrop for several movies and television series and the city remains invested in bringing filmmakers to its location, as is evidenced by a 25% tax credit on all Rhode Island spending offered to motion picture companies.

The animated television series Family Guy takes place in Quahog, a fictional suburb of Providence, and prominently features the most pronounced segment of Providence's skyline several times an episode (the buildings are One Financial Plaza, 50 Kennedy Plaza, and the Superman Building).

The city and its name were used in the television series Providence, and Showtime's new series, Brotherhood, was also filmed and set in Providence.

The Farrelly brothers used the city as a backdrop for several of their movies, notably Dumb and Dumber and There's Something About Mary. Peter Farrelly set Outside Providence in Pawtucket, adjacent to Providence. The 1991 American-Canadian film Providence takes place at Brown University. Although not set in Providence, the movie Amistad used the exterior of the Rhode Island State House as the United States Capitol exterior. The movie Little Children was also filmed in Providence. In 2006, Providence was the primary filming location for the film Underdog.

References

Providence
Mass media in Providence, Rhode Island